Crotyl chloride is an organochloride with the molecular formula C4H7Cl.

References

Chloroalkenes
Crotyl compounds